The Hutheesing family is a Jain family from the city of Ahmedabad in Gujarat, India. Several temples and charitable institutions in Ahmedabad have been built or founded by members of this mercantile family. Krishna Hutheesing, a sister of Jawaharlal Nehru, was a member of this family by marriage.

History
The family has a known history of over 250 years. In the mid-1700s, the Mughal empire was in decline, rebellions were breaking out in several places, and general lawlessness prevailed in much of northern India. The traditional trade routes between northern India and central Asia were unworkable. Meanwhile, the European powers had established their trading interests on the coast, and this presented a lucrative and safe business opportunity. To meet the changing dynamics of the era, some members of the Jain trading community moved from Osian in the Marwar region of Rajasthan to Khambhat (Cambay) in Gujarat, which was at that time a major port city and a center of the European trade. The progenitors of the Hutheesing family were among the immigrants.

Initially, the wealthy and industrious immigrants were not unwelcome. They ingratiated themselves with the Mughal-appointed governors of Khambhat and prospered to the extent that they soon became the owners of a few ships that sailed abroad for trade. However, the group from Osian became involved in certain intrigues and the Mughal authorities consequently confiscated their ships. They also lost the goodwill of the local authorities and were unable to carry on their trade in the atmosphere of suspicion and hostility. Ultimately, they abandoned direct involvement with international trade and moved inland to the large trading city of Ahmedabad, which was ruled by a rival (albeit Mughal-appointed) satrap. Here they became prosperous traders.

Sheth Hutheesing
 In Ahmedabad, the community prospered in trade. Perhaps the most prosperous trader among them was Hutheesing, son of Kesarising, who amassed a colossal fortune. Hutheesing was the grandson of one of the men who emigrated from Osian to Khambhat and then to Ahmedabad. He lived during the first half of the 19th century. His descendants (both adopted and biological) took his first name as their surname and came to be known as the "Hutheesing family".

Hutheesing Kesarising was married three times but neither his first wife nor his second wife produced a living male heir, although there were at least two living daughters and one boy who lived to the age of five, besides some miscarriages and other infant deaths. His third wife (who was much younger than him) produced no child at all for several years after their marriage. This third wife was named Harkunwar and she hailed from the village of Ghogha near Bhavnagar. The two daughters were married at a young age, per the custom of that era, and sent away to live in their marital homes. Thereafter, in keeping with Indian tradition, the couple adopted the three sons of Hutheesing's brother, Dolabhai. The boys were named Jaisingbhai, Maganbhai and Mulchandbhai. Ironically, within a couple of years after the adoptions, Harkunwar finally became pregnant and gave birth to a son, whom they named Umabhai.

According to Jain custom and society, their biological son was treated just like his adopted brothers; before his death, Hutheesing portioned out his wealth in equal measure to all his sons, and at his death, it was the eldest adopted boy, Jaising, who officiated at his funeral as his eldest son.

Harkunwar Bai and Descendants
After the death of Seth Hutheesing, his sons carried on the family's trading business harmoniously, while his wife, Harkunwar Bai, devoted herself to prayer and charities. The entire family continued to live together in their palatial residence, Hutheesing-ni-Vadi. This was a massive haveli (Indian-style mansion-with-courtyards) built by Huteesing just outside the gates of the old walled city of Amedabad. The mansion stood within a large compound, which contained walled gardens, an orchard, mews and small houses for servants and dependents.

Hutheesing had intended to build a grand Jain temple within this compound. Before his death, Hutheesing and Harkunwar had performed the required religious ceremonies and jointly laid the symbolic "first stone" of the temple. Hutheesing had finalized the layout and plan of the temple and was in the process of arranging finances and engaging craftsmen. The task of bringing his pious dream to fruition fell upon Harkunwar and her sons. It was Harkunwar who supervised the construction of the 52-Jinalaya  Hutheesing Jain Temple within the compound of her house. The temple took several years to be built. It is constructed of stone in the traditional way, without steel, cement or mortar. It is richly ornamented with intricate and beautiful stone carvings and is now regarded as one of the architectural treasures of the city. It houses 238 stone images, 83 metal images and 21 yantras. The Pratishtha (consecration) of the temple was conducted by Shantisagar Suri, a famous saint. The festivities were attended by as many as 400,000 people.

When the construction of the Hutheesing Jain temple was nearing completion, and preparations were afoot for its grand consecration, the need was felt for a suitable Dharamshala to accommodate the expected visitors. It occurred to Harkunwar Bai that a Derasar or Jain monastery should be built, which would accommodate the visitors in the first instance and then serve as a center of the Jain faith for all time to come. she decided to build a Derasar, or Jain monastery in the city. The presence of such an institution would add luster and virtue to the beauty of the temple. She mentioned her wishes to her sons, and they readily agreed that it was an excellent idea, and the Dharmanath Derasar was duly built and endowed by them, and its consecration was held a couple of days before the consecration of the temple. The Derasar is situated in the Nisha Pol precinct of Ahmedabad, in the near vicinity of the Hutheesing temple.

Harkunvar Bai, who had been much younger than her husband, lived to old age. After the death of her husband, as a pious Indian widow, she wore only plain white cotton sarees for the rest of her life, entirely gave up all jewelry and ornamentation, and spent a large portion of her waking hours in prayer. She later built two further temples, on a smaller scale, within one kilometer from her house in Ahmedabad. These are the Sambhavnath and Chintamani Parshvanath temples in the Zaveriwad neighbourhood of Ahmedabad. She commissioned the construction of a Gaushala or animal shelter for aged cattle and other animals. She constructed Piaos and Sada-varta shelters near certain Jain temples, where basic food, cool water and a shady shelter were provided free to pilgrims and devotees. She constructed and endowed a Dharamshala, or free pilgrims' inn, at Samet Shikhar, a center of Jain pilgrimage located in distant Jharkhand. She organized and funded pilgrimages for poor Jain families of Ahmedabad to travel to Samet Shikhar. She donated funds towards building the Ahmedabad Civil Hospital. She also built a school for girls— the Maganlal Karamchand Girls' School in Ahmedabad in 1850, when the general public was still not in favor of female education. Her pious charities, good works and personal austerity made her a figure of veneration among the people of Ahmedabad.

The family trade included wooden furniture in association with Lockwood de Forest, which was a rage in the US then, and kundan jewellery to Tiffany's in the US.

Ahmedabad Wood Carving Company was set up in 1881 by an American interior decorator, Lockwood de Forest, in association with Maganbhai Hutheesing to export wooden furniture, carved doors, cabinets, picture frames etc.

The family became known for its marital alliances. They are related to the Kasturbhai Lalbhai family as well as Jawaharlal Nehru. Krishna Nehru Hutheesing was married to Gunottam P. Hutheesing, (nicknamed Raja).

Purushottam Hutheesing's other son Surottam P. Hutheesing was a noted industrialist and served as Chairman of Ahmedabad Textile Mill's Association's President for year 1954-55. He was first to invite noted architect, Le Corbusier to India, who later did many works in India. The Mill Owners' Association Building and Villa Shodhan were the works assigned to him by Surottam Hutheesing

Ahmedabad's main art venue, Leila & Purushottam Hutheesing Visual Art Centre, as well as the Purshottambhai Maganbhai & Leila P Hutheesing Public Charitable Trust is named after Maganbhai's son Purshottambhai. He was married to Leila (Dahiben), the daughter of Lalbhai Dalpatbhai, and the sister of Kasturbhai Lalbhai. Purushottam Hutheesing's son Gunottam was married to Jawaharlal Nehru's sister  Krishna Nehru Hutheesing. But in 1946 Raja Gunottam Hutheesing (INC) lost his first electoral bid for the Nagpada-Kamathipura BMC election constituency to an  independent Linganna Pujari (1914-1999). Pujari subsequently joined the Congress Party in 1947 at Nehruji's invitation.

Gunottam's sister Shrimati was married to Saumyendranath Tagore, a grandnephew of Rabindranath Tagore. Shrimati had studied at Shantiniketan and had remained associated with it. Saumendranath Tagore became one of the founders of the Communist movement in India.

Rajiv Gandhi, later a prime minister of India, was born in Mumbai at the home of his uncle and aunt, Gunottam (Raja) and Krishna Hutheesing, while his parents were guests at their home located at 20 Carmichael Road in Bombay.

Ajit Hutheesing (1936–2017), a son of Gunottam, also lived in the home and spent many years living with Nehru in his home in Delhi. He later migrated to the US in the early 1960s and became one of the first Indians on Wall Street when he started his investment banking career. He was married to the American violinist Helen Armstrong from 1996 till her demise in 2006. He had three sons, Nikhil, Vivek and Ravi, and three grandchildren, Kirin Hutheesing, Remy Hutheesing and Mirai Hutheesing.

Family tree 

 Kesarising married Surajba
 Dolabhai Kesarising
 Hatheesing Kesarising, married Harkunwar and two others
 Three adopted sons: Jaisingbhai, Maganbhai and Mulchandbhai from his brother Dolabhai; Umabhai from Harkunwar
Maganlal Hutheesing, had son Purushottam Hutheesing
Purushottam Hutheesing married Leila (Dahiben),  the daughter of Lalbhai Dalpatbhai and Mohini, and the sister of Kasturbhai Lalbhai; had two sons: Surottam and Gunottam (Raja), and a daughter Shrimati
Sarvottam Hutheesing had two sons Deepak & Janak & three daughters
Deepak Hutheesing, married Daksha and had a son Umang & daughter Urvi
Janak Hutheesing married Nina and had one son Shaum who was named after Shaumyendranath Tagore
Gunottam (Raja) Hutheesing married Krishna Nehru (1907–1967), daughter of Motilal Nehru and Swarup Rani Nehru, See Nehru-Gandhi family; Had two sons: Harsha and Ajit
Harsha Hutheesing
Ajit Hutheesing (1936-2017) married Amrita Nigam (m. 1960 - div. 1987) (three sons Nikhil, Vivek and Ravi Hutheesing (born 1971)); married Helen Armstrong (m. 1996 - died 2006) (His stepchildren Debbie Howser and son David Cohen).
Ajit's children: Nikhil, Vivek and Ravi Hutheesing; Ajit's stepchildren: Debbie Howser and son David Cohen
Ajit's grandchildren: Kirin Hutheesing, Remy Hutheesing and Mirai Hutheesing
Shrimati married Saumyendranath Tagore, a nephew of Rabindranath Tagore, See Tagore family.

See also
 Ajit Hutheesing
 Ravi Hutheesing
 Villa Shodhan

References

External links
 Hutheesing Family Website maintained by Umang Hutheesing

Business families of India
Jain families
People from Ahmedabad
Gujarati people